The glans (plural "glandes" ; from the Latin word for "acorn") is a vascular structure located at the tip of the penis in male mammals or a homologous genital structure of the clitoris in female mammals.

Structure
The exterior structure of the glans consists of mucous membrane, which is usually covered by foreskin or clitoral hood in naturally developed genitalia. This covering, called the prepuce, is normally retractable in adulthood.

The glans naturally joins with the frenulum of the penis or clitoris, as well as the inner labia in women, and the foreskin in uncircumcised men. In non-technical or sexual discussions, often the word "clitoris" refers to the external glans alone, excluding the clitoral hood, frenulum, and internal body of the clitoris. Similarly, phrases "tip" or "head" of the penis refers to the glans alone.

Sex differences in humans
In males, the glans is known as the glans penis, while in females the glans is known as the clitoral glans.

In females, the clitoris is above the urethra. The glans of the clitoris is the most highly innervated part of the external female genitalia.

In spotted hyenas, the female's pseudo-penis can be distinguished from the male's penis by its greater thickness and more rounded glans. In both male and female spotted hyenas, the base of the glans is covered with penile spines.

Development
In the development of the urinary and reproductive organs, the glans is derived from the genital tubercle.

See also
Glanuloplasty

References

Sexual anatomy